Child prostitution is prevalent in all major cities in West Africa with girls typically being the focus, as boys in the sex trade are often overlooked. Reasons for entrance into prostitution vary including child trafficking and forces associated with "survival sex" such as poverty, sexual abuse, and homelessness, all with resulting effects such as the spread of HIV and STIs. Underage individuals partaking in the sex trade is perceived as taboo in many communities in West African countries, however, there are only a limited number of established policies or developed programs in some countries aiming to combat the health concerns regarding children in prostitution.

Causes

Survival sex

Poverty 
Determined causes of widespread child prostitution in West Africa are mostly anecdotal with poverty leading as the underlying driving factor. Children in a financial crisis turn to practicing prostitution in order to provide for their family and themselves.

On the other hand, children's entrance into prostitution in West Africa is also a result of their parents’ evaluation of their families circumstance. If a family is at a financial deficit, or looking to maintain a certain lifestyle, the heads of the household, the parents, may decide to send their children off to seek work away from home in order to improve their household income. If the child is hesitant in leaving their home the parent may be forceful, compelling the child to leave.

Family dysfunctions 
In addition to poverty, children with family dysfunctions are at a higher risk for involvement in prostitution. Adolescents who face negligence or domestic abuse often times flee their home and partake in the sex trade. This displacement from their home leaves these children predisposed to entering the sex trade. Another source for the entrance of minors into the sex trade includes sexual abuse. Children in the sex trade were often subjected to some form of sexual abuse prior to partaking in prostitution. The journey of a child's entrance into the sex trade is often the result of a long process often beginning with sexual abuse experienced between the ages of nine and eleven. Additional situations increasing the likelihood of a child in prostitution include: foster care, domestic work, a lack of parental support, child maltreatment, forced marriage, dropping out of school, and illiteracy.

Sex trafficking 
Child prostitution is the most common form of commercial exploitation of children (CSEC), which also includes child trafficking for sexual purposes.  With trafficking, children are forced into migrating within or across national boundaries to engage in  commercial sex unwillingly. Though child prostitution is prohibited by the United Nation’s Optional protocol on the Sale of Children, Child Prostitution and Child Pornography of 2000, it still remains prevalent in West African Countries. Several policymakers have affirmed that child trafficking is one of the fastest growing organized crimes in the world. Its ability to survive the restraints set by laws protecting the children is attributed to the resulting profitable capital. For delivering children to employers within Africa, recruiters could earn anywhere from 50 to 1,000 dollars with the successful delivery of an African child to the United States receiving as much as 10,000 to 20,000 dollars.

Effects

HIV/AIDs and STDs 
The increased spread of HIV, AIDs, and STDs is affiliated with the increased sexual exploitation of children in the sex trade. The high susceptibility of adolescents in West Africa to HIV and STDs is a result of various factors including their lack of access to condoms, their inability to negotiate its use, and a fear of losing clients as well as their income. Furthermore, the uncorroborated , yet far spread concept that having sex with children protects against HIV and cures AIDs further increases the desire of buyers for children in the sex trade. Underage girls are further sexually exploited under the preconceived notion by the buyer that they are less likely to have sexual diseases and are easier to persuade in having unprotected sex.

Mental effects 
Children removed from sex trafficking can be suicidal and suffer from a loss of confidence more so if they lack a stable support system.

Boys in prostitution 
Underage boys partaking in prostitution is often times overlooked and not seen as an imperative issue in Western Africa. Anti-gay opinions have become the norm in Africa with some countries criminalizing homosexuality. In most African countries the extensiveness of boy prostitution is seldom admitted or expressed as an issue, due to a combination of deeply rooted gender roles set by religion and sociocultural values. 

The greatest leading factor in West Africa leaving boys more prone to prostitution is homelessness. This displacement from their home is a result of an assortment of reasons including: sexual abuse, homophobia, and discrimination, all common experiences for people within this population. Many underage boys fled their home as a means to escape physically and/or sexually abusive households while others who identify as gay fled their home as a result of the homophobic atmosphere. 

In regards to boys in the sex trade, they engage in commercial sex predominantly as a response to their homelessness. Unlike their female counterpart, boys in prostitution are rarely ever under the control of a pimp and instead are mostly actively in charge in their practice of prostitution. Thus, they are given a sense of independence over their involvement in prostitution. This false perception of control, however, results in law enforcement as well as  agencies focused on aiding distressed children to overlook and even disregard boys in prostitution. For example, if arrested, boys in prostitution are charged with prostitution much less than prostituted girls, and are instead charged with other crimes. This tendency of higher authorities dismissing encounters of underage boys in prostitution reduces the chances of them getting referred help and assistance. Overall, the combination of a lack of awareness from service providers regarding the nature of boys in prostitution as well as the boys reluctance to seek aid, as in some African countries even boys who are victims of rape could be punished by law for having homosexual relations, limits the ability of the boys to access support.

Preventions by country

Benin 
Several parties are involved in the formation of Benin’s anti-trafficking laws aiming to protect children from child trafficking through two measures including the promotion of an overall healthy childhood as well as precautionary measures required for child relocation. These key organizations include the Justice Ministry which has an office specifically dedicated to child protection, the Family Ministry, UNICEF Benin, whose primary activities center around child-trafficking as seen on their website, and the ILO with their flagship project focused on protecting children from trafficking, LUTRENA. Furthermore Benin has implemented a law that regulates the movement of children and suppresses child trafficking. This law entails extensive requirements for a child’s relocation within the country borders in order to provide law enforcement agencies with a means to arrest and discourage traffickers.

Ghana 
Ghana’s established Criminal Offenses Act 1960 provides several protections for child victims of sexual exploitation. The act states that children under the age of 12 can not legally be held accountable for their actions, however, many of the offences set to protect children only apply when a child is below the age of 16. This leaves victims of commercial sexual exploitation between the ages of 16 and 18 liable to being criminalized.

Liberia 
In Liberia, the trafficking of children, meaning anyone below the age of 18, for the purpose of prostitution can be charged with up to 20 years of imprisonment. Furthermore, the law of Liberia states that a child who is the victim of sexual exploitation cannot be criminalized. Though Liberia has enacted an anti-trafficking law, its implementation has been limited due to a high amount of corruption and a low amount of resources.

References 

Wikipedia Student Program
Prostitution in Africa
Child prostitution
Childhood in Africa